Sigatica is a genus of predatory sea snails, marine gastropod mollusks in the family Naticidae, the moon snails.

Species
Species within the genus Sigatica include:

 Sigatica carolinensis (Dall, 1889)
 Sigatica cubana Espinosa, Ortea & Fernadez-Garcés, 2007
 Sigatica peleum (Iredale, 1929)
 Sigatica pomatiella (Melvill, 1893)
 Sigatica semisulcata (Gray, 1839)

References

External links

Naticidae